Robert Youells is a fitness model, heavyweight bodybuilding champion, IFBB Pro bodybuilder and an actor. He is best known for his work as a voice actor in Grand Theft Auto IV: The Ballad of Gay Tony (2009). He is the drummer for the heavy metal band Generation Kill and has appeared on Saturday Night Live (2005), and Deadly Sins (TV series) (2012).

Early life and education 
Youells was born in Livingston, New Jersey. He began taking drum lessons at 6, studying with Rick Aquino until age 9. At 11, he switched to studying with Keith Necessary, a student of Joe Morello. He also studied with Joe Nevolo for a few years.

Career 
Youells has appeared on Saturday Night Live (2005), Late Night with Conan O’Brien, and Guiding Light. He is also the cast member of Off Season and had a supporting role in a short film, Meet My Boyfriend, which screened at the 2011 Manhattan Film Festival. Youells has also appeared in The Sitter. He provided the voice of Evan Moss in The Lost and Damned and The Ballad of Gay Tony. Youells has modeled for Vogue and Muscle and Fitness.

Recently, he was a drummer for the New York based thrash/rap band Fragile Mortals, featuring Darryl McDaniels of the rap/rock legends Run-DMC. After Youells joined, the band released an album titled DMC Generation Kill. In 2004, Youells started in National Bodybuilding, and took a break in 2013 due to his mother's death,. He then joined back in 2014, when he won the Masters Over 35 Overall.[14] Contributing to Muscle and Fitness Magazine, sharing his thoughts regarding fitness and gym culture. In 2012, he was a sponsored athlete with Muscular Development.

Competition history

2004 

 East Coast Championships - NPC, Heavyweight, 2nd
 Eastern USA Championships - NPC, Heavyweight, 2nd
 Nationals - NPC, Heavyweight, did not place

2009 

 Atlantic States Championships - NPC, Heavyweight, 3rd
 East Coast Championships - NPC, Overall Winner
 East Coast Championships - NPC, Super-Heavyweight, 1st
 Eastern USA Championships - NPC, Heavyweight, 3rd
 Junior Nationals - NPC, Heavyweight, 4th
 Nationals - NPC, Heavyweight, 14th

2010 

 North American Championships - IFBB, Heavyweight, 3rd

2011 

 Nationals - NPC, Heavyweight, 2nd
 North American Championships - IFBB, Heavyweight, 6th

2012 

 Nationals - NPC, Heavyweight, 3rd
 North American Championships - IFBB, Masters 35+ Heavyweight, 2nd
 North American Championships - IFBB, Heavyweight, 4th
 USA Championships - NPC, Heavyweight, 3rd

2014 

 Pittsburgh Pro - IFBB, Masters 40+, 2nd
 Tampa Pro Championships - IFBB, Did not place
 Team Universe Championships - NPC, Masters 35+ Heavyweight, 1st
 Team Universe Championships - NPC, Masters 40+ Heavyweight, 2nd
 Team Universe Championships - NPC, Masters 35+ Overall Winner

References 

American bodybuilders
Year of birth missing (living people)
Living people